Ryszard Syski (April 8, 1924 in Płock, Poland - June 11, 2007 in Silver Spring, Maryland) was a Polish-American mathematician whose research was in queueing theory.

During World War II he was in the Armia Krajowa with his parents, partaking in the Warsaw uprising, being imprisoned in Lamsdorf, Silesia and Bavaria (1944), and joining the Polish Second Corps for fights in Italy (1945).

His studies in mathematics started in London, at the Polish University Abroad (1946).  He
joined Automatic Telephone and Electric Co. in London (1952).
He got his B.Sc. (1954) and Ph.D. (1961) at University of London, on the dissertation
Stochastic Process in Banach space and its Applications to Congestion Theory.

Encouraged by Thomas L. Saaty he moved to College Park, Maryland, joining  the mathematics faculty of University of Maryland (1961–1999), 
founded the journal Stochastic Processes and their Applications (1973) 
and was fellow of the Institute of Mathematical Statistics.  
Syski wrote over forty journal articles, often collaborating with notables such as
Félix Pollaczek,
Lajos Takács,
Julian Keilson and
Wim Cohen.  
Syski died of complications from a brain injury received during a fall.

Books
Introduction to congestion theory in telephone systems (North-Holland, 1960)
Passage times for Markov chains (1992)

References

1924 births
2007 deaths
People from Płock
20th-century American mathematicians
21st-century American mathematicians
20th-century Polish mathematicians
21st-century Polish mathematicians
Queueing theorists
Alumni of the University of London
University of Maryland, College Park faculty
Home Army members
Warsaw Uprising insurgents
Polish emigrants to the United States
Polish expatriates in the United Kingdom